The Royal Easter Show is an event held annually during Easter in Auckland, New Zealand. It was first held in 1843 and since then has included agricultural events, art exhibitions, live entertainment, sporting events, rides, sideshows, a marketplace and circuses. The show is held at the Epsom Showgrounds in Epsom. Due to the COVID-19 pandemic in New Zealand, the show was not held in 2020 or 2021.

History 
The Royal Easter Show was first held in 1843.
In 2013, the show featured the largest ferris wheel in Auckland's history. The free event in 2014 attracted more than 130,000 attendees. In 2016, hundreds of people claimed that they would boycott the show after pictures of injured animals were shared. The free event in 2019 offered farm animals, FMX shows, a Looney Tunes Live Show, rides and a performance by Tiki Taane.

The 2020 show, scheduled for 9 –13 April, was cancelled due to crowd restrictions introduced to combat the COVID-19 pandemic in New Zealand. This was only the second time in 177 years that the show was not held.
The 2021 show was also cancelled.

Competitions and awards 
The Royal Easter Show is host to the Wine Awards, New Zealand's longest-running wine competition, and therefore also one of the most competitive. also hosted are the Art Awards, New Zealand's largest open art competition.

See also
 Sydney Royal Easter Show

References

External links 
 

Annual events in New Zealand
Festivals in Auckland
Easter traditions
Autumn events in New Zealand